Brdar is a surname. Notable people with the surname include:

 Jakov Brdar (born 1949), Slovene-Bosnian sculptor
 Michael Brdar (born 1994), American baseball coach
 Robert Brdar (born 1995), Croatian footballer

See also
 

South Slavic-language surnames
Croatian surnames